Pusztaföldvár is a village in Békés County, in the Southern Great Plain region of south-east Hungary. In 2015, the village had a population of 1,662.

References

Populated places in Békés County